SupplyHouse.com is the leading online plumbing, HVAC, and electrical supplies distributor in the USA. The company is headquartered in Melville, New York. and has fulfillment centers in Columbus, OH; Cranbury, NJ; Farmer’s Branch, TX; and Reno, NV, offering 1-day and 2-day shipping across 95% of the United States. Their website lists over 200,000 products from over 450 brands and serves over 100,000 trade professionals annually.

History
In 2004, Josh Meyerowitz founded PlumbingGoods.com in New York City with the goal of adapting his family’s 90-year-old plumbing supply business to continue to find success in an e-commerce marketplace. Over the next decade, the company grew into a prominent sales hub for plumbing supplies and went through a series of name changes, eventually choosing SupplyHouse.com in 2014. 

In 2014 SupplyHouse.com launched their TradeMaster program as a free-to-join membership for professionals in the skilled trades. The program gives members exclusive benefits including access to a dedicated customer service phone line, free shipping and returns, and discounts on every order.

In 2015, SupplyHouse.com opened a new fulfillment center in Columbus, Ohio to shorten delivery times in the Midwest. The Columbus City Council voted on a tax incentive that provided support for SupplyHouse's growth in the region due to the new fulfillment center's potential to create new jobs.  After their initial Columbus expansion was deemed a success, the company continued to strategically expand to Reno, Nevada and Farmer’s Branch, Texas to expedite shipping across Western states.

In 2017, SupplyHouse.com began offering same-day delivery services in select regions – a move that drew comparisons to the online retail leader, Amazon, which had also recently announced regional same-day delivery services.

In 2022, the TradeMaster program surpassed 100,000 members.

Leadership

Josh Meyerowitz and Fernando Cunha were finalists for the 2016 EY New York Entrepreneur of the Year. Meyerowitz speculated that the recognition was in part due to the company's inclusion on the New York's 2016 Best Companies to Work for list.

Since 2016, SupplyHouse.com has been included in several Top Places to Work lists for both Long Island and New York. Its unique corporate environment can be attributed to Meyerowitz and Cunha's commitment to outlining a noble purpose and core values to guide the company’s day-to-day operations.

Core Values 
SupplyHouse.com emphasizes their core values of generosity, respect, innovation, teamwork – usually referred to by the acronym GRIT. Each employee is encouraged to embody GRIT in both their personal and professional lives. The focus on personal growth and development helps SupplyHouse.com establish and maintain a culture conducive to cooperation and is often cited as a driving force behind their success.

Giving Back 

The company prioritizes charitable giving through various donations and service-based initiatives held throughout the year.  Giving initiatives have included participating in the Long Island Cares Annual School Drive to help parents send their children to school with essential school supplies and partnering with local organizations like Madonna Heights and Island Harvest. At Madonna Heights, employees would help paint, garden, or clean the campus.  In order to end hunger and reduce waste, SupplyHouse.com has helped Island Harvest, a local food bank, pack canned goods to help those in need.

Trade Tuesday 
In 2010, SupplyHouse.com launched “Trade Tuesday” to show appreciation and support for the trade community. In 2021, SupplyHouse.com made a social media donation post which resulted in a contribution of $60,000 to the Plumbing Heating Cooling Contractors National Association (PHCC) Education Foundation. PHCC Educational Foundation educates the public about opportunities in the trades through workforce development initiatives, scholarship programs, and management workshops.

References 

Companies based in New York (state)